Schwalbach can refer to several places in Germany:

Bad Schwalbach, in the Rheingau-Taunus-Kreis, Hesse
Schwalbach am Taunus, in the Main-Taunus-Kreis, Hesse
Schwalbach, Saarland, in the district of Saarlouis, Saarland
 Schwalbach (Sulzbach), a river of Hesse, Germany

People
 George J. Schwalbach (1866–1966), American politician
 Henry V. Schwalbach (1878–1958), American politician
 John F. Schwalbach (1845–1915), American politician
 Jennifer Schwalbach Smith (born 1971), American actress